General Teaching Council could mean:

 General Teaching Council for Scotland
 General Teaching Council for Northern Ireland
 General Teaching Council for England (until 2012)
 General Teaching Council for Wales (until 2015)